Eugene Curtsinger (January 4, 1924 - October 22, 2008) was an American literary scholar, academic administrator and novelist. He began his career at Marquette University and taught at the University of Dallas for five decades, where he was the founding dean and the chair of its English department. He authored eight novels.

Selected works

References

1924 births
2008 deaths
University of Notre Dame alumni
Marquette University faculty
University of Dallas faculty
American university and college faculty deans
American male novelists
20th-century American novelists
21st-century American novelists
20th-century American male writers
21st-century American male writers
20th-century American academics